Misleševo is a village in the municipality of Struga, North Macedonia.

Demographics
As of the 2021 census, Misleševo had 2,969 residents with the following ethnic composition:
Macedonians 2,195
Albanians 368
Others (including Torbeš) 182
Persons for whom data are taken from administrative sources 100
Turks 50
Vlachs 38
Roma 26
Serbs 7
Bosniaks 3

According to the 2002 census, the village had a total of 3,507 inhabitants. Ethnic groups in the village include:
Macedonians 2,791
Albanians 527
Vlachs 66
Turks 28
Serbs 15 
Romani 13
Others 67

References

External links

Villages in Struga Municipality
Albanian communities in North Macedonia